Knock-down fasteners are a class of fasteners designed to allow for repeated assembly and disassembly. They are often used in flat pack furniture, which is typified by items such as book cases and wall units that come in a package of pre-cut and pre-drilled components ready to assemble by a novice. Knock-down fasteners can generally be assembled with a single driver, such as a hex key, which may be included in a hardware kit that comes with the product. They self-align when tightened, and allow for a secure connection without requiring drilling or gluing by the consumer.

One common type of knock-down fastener is the cam lock, used in butt joints. After two members are brought together, a cam lock in one member is twisted, locking onto a dowel extending from the second member, and securing the joint.

Specialist tools and jigs are often required for the repeatable installation of knock-down fasteners (but not for assembly of prefabricated flat-pack furniture), so they tend to be limited to those who are making mass-produced items. However, there are applications in which the hobbyist can benefit from the range of fasteners that are available. They are easier and require less skill to install than some of the other more traditional techniques.

Knock-down fasteners are typically used for carcase joinery; furniture designs using them are usually of frameless construction.

Used for:

Wide application in cabinet making depending on type of fastener: particularly in carcase construction (e.g. Carcase sides to top and bottom, fixed shelving/partitions, drawer boxes, counter tops to carcase)

See also 
 Furniture screws

Mechanical fasteners